The Kutubu tandan (Oloplotosus torobo)  is a species of fish in the family Plotosidae. It is endemic to Lake Kutubu in the Kikori River system, Papua New Guinea.

Sources

Oloplotosus
Freshwater fish of Papua New Guinea
Fish described in 1985
Taxonomy articles created by Polbot